Swell Radio was a mobile radio streaming application that learned user listening preferences based on listening behavior, community filtering, and a proprietary algorithm. Originally designed for use while commuting to and from work, the service focused on delivering spoken-word audio content to users. Major streaming partners included ABC News Radio, NPR, PRI, and TED

According to the company website, the app was available on iOS devices worldwide but content was customized to the United States and Canada. The application was “ad-free” and the company was not monetizing.

In July 2014, Apple acquired the Swell app for $30 million.  As part of the deal, the app was removed from the iOS App Store and became a part of Apple.

History 

Concept.io, creator of Swell Radio, raised $5.4 million in Series A Funding led by venture capital firm Draper Fisher Jurvetson. The application originally launched the application on the iOS platform in Canada in early 2013 and officially launched in the United States on June 27, 2013.

References

Further reading 

6 Apps That Turn Your Phone into a Radio
Swell's iPhone App Aims to Take the Pain Out of Podcasts
A Swell App for Discovering Podcasts
Swell App Makes Podcasts Work For Smartphone Generation

Streaming media systems
IOS software
Podcasting software
2013 software
Apple Inc. acquisitions
2014 mergers and acquisitions
Defunct online companies of the United States